The Mayor of Caloocan is the head of the local government of the city of Caloocan who elected to three-year terms. The mayor is also the executive head and leads the city's departments in executing the city ordinances and improving public services. The city mayor is restricted to three consecutive terms, totaling nine years, although a mayor can be elected again after an interruption of one term.

Dale Gonzalo Malapitan is the incumbent mayor of the city since June 2022.

List

 Mayor of the City of Greater Manila which included the Municipality of Caloocan. 
 Concurrently served as the Assistant Mayor of the City of Greater Manila for Caloocan. 
 Served in an acting capacity.

Elections
2010 Caloocan local elections
2013 Caloocan local elections
2016 Caloocan local elections
2019 Caloocan local elections
2022 Caloocan local elections

References

Caloocan
Caloocan